Snapp House, also known as Wildflower Farm, is a historic home located near Fishers Hill, Shenandoah County, Virginia.  It was built about 1790, and is a two-story Continental log dwelling sheathed in weatherboard.  It sits on a limestone basement and has a two-story, rubble limestone rear ell with a central chimney.  A small frame structure connects the log section to the rear ell.  Also on the property is the contributing site of a spring house.

It was listed on the National Register of Historic Places in 1979.

References

Houses on the National Register of Historic Places in Virginia
Houses completed in 1790
Houses in Shenandoah County, Virginia
National Register of Historic Places in Shenandoah County, Virginia